is the first single by the Japanese band Orange Range. It was released on August 25, 2002.

Track listing
 ミチシルベ (Michishirube)
 ミッドナイトゲージ (Midnight Gauge)
 キリキリマイ ～リューキューディスコRemix～ (Kirikirimai ~ Ryukyu Disco Remix ~)

Charts
The single reached #133 and charted for 10 weeks.

References

External links
 Official Site

2002 singles
Orange Range songs
2002 songs